Autobus Number Two is a 1929 German silent comedy film directed by Max Mack and starring Fritz Kampers, Lee Parry, and Georg Alexander. It was shot at the Terra Studios in Berlin. The film's art direction was by Bruno Lutz and Stephen Welcke.

Cast
Fritz Kampers as Fritz Marunge, bus conductor
Lee Parry as Hanne, his wife
Marion Mirimanian as Christine, their child
Georg Alexander as Lawyer Dr. Ponsar
Elza Temary as Vicky
Jakob Tiedtke as Jakob, Dr. Ponsar's assistant
Sylvia Torf as the inspector's wife
Lore Braun as Anni
Ernõ Szenes as commissioner

References

External links

1929 comedy films
German comedy films
Films of the Weimar Republic
Films directed by Max Mack
German silent feature films
Terra Film films
German black-and-white films
Silent comedy films
Films shot at Terra Studios
1920s German films
1920s German-language films